Ilha Fiscal, or Fiscal Island, is an island in Guanabara Bay, bordering the historic city center of Rio de Janeiro, in southeastern Brazil.

Originally named by Europeans as Rat Island, its current name comes from the fact that the customs department has been stationed there before Guarda Fiscal, serving the port of the then-capital of the Empire during the nineteenth century. The customs offices were housed at a Neo-Gothic palace built under Pedro II, which occupies most of the island. The island became famous as the site of the famous Fiscal Island Ball, the last royal ball of the Empire before the coup d'état that proclaimed the Republic in November 1889.

History 
The New York Times' Marlise Simons considers the former-Customs House a "preposterous neo-Gothic edifice of green turrets."

During the Fiscal Island Ball, held on 9 November 1889 and considered "the last ball of the Empire,"  Afonso Celso, Viscount of Ouro Preto, Deodato Cesino Vilella dos Santos,  and Saldanha da Gama were members of the reception committee. The ball was in honor of a visiting Chilean delegation of naval men, with an alleged attendance of six thousand guests. An often-legend states that after the ball 8 bodices, 17 silk pillows, 3 corsets, 17 garters and 9 epaulets.

During the Revolt of the Lash, on 23 November 1910, the Brazilian battleship São Paulo was located off the island and headed out of the bay unscathed.  painted The Last Dance of Ilha Fiscal, based on the 1889 ball, in 1905. Since 1914, the Navy's Directorate of Hydrography and Navigation has been based on Ilha Fiscal. After the Oceanographic Institute of the University of São Paulo, the Directorate was the second institution in Brazil to carry out oceanographic research. Monica Hirst argumented before the meeting that resulted in the 1994 Protocol of Ouro Preto that it should not be compared to the Ilha Fiscal Ball. In 2002, b34usinessman Alexandre Accioly celebrated his 40th birthday at Ilha Fiscal. As part of the 2005 Rio Fashion Week, designer Clara Vasconcelos showcased the Tessuti 2006 summer collection runway show held on a runway with 150 seat capacity in the form of an "A". During the Mensalão scandal, presidential advisor Ricardo Kotscho made a public statement which Folha de S.Paulo journalist  compared to the infamous ball, "where the court danced while the monarchy collapsed."

Ilha Fiscal now hosts a museum of cultural history housed in the that is maintained by the Navy of Brazil. Boat and land tours depart the nearby  and travel to and around Ilha Fiscal.

See also

 
 List of castles in Brazil

Notes

References

External links 

 3-D model of the Ilha Fiscal Custom House

Atlantic islands of Brazil
Balls (dance party)
Castles in Brazil
Custom houses
Entertainment events in Brazil
Entertainment venues in Brazil
Events in Rio de Janeiro (city)
Geography of Rio de Janeiro (city)
Gothic Revival architecture in Brazil
Government buildings completed in 1889
Government buildings in Brazil
Guanabara Bay
Historical events in Brazil
Landforms of Rio de Janeiro (state)
Military installations of Brazil
Military and war museums in Brazil
Museums in Rio de Janeiro (city)
November 1889 events
Pedro II of Brazil
Towers in Brazil